Remember the Daze, originally titled The Beautiful Ordinary, is a 2007 drama film released in theaters in April 2008. The film was directed by Jess Manafort. The plot of the movie has been described as "a glimpse into the teenage wasteland of suburbia 1999 that takes place over 24-hours, and the teenagers who make their way through the last day of high school in the last year of the past millennium."

The film was selected as one of the eight films competing in the Narrative Competition at the 2007 Los Angeles Film Festival which took place June 21-July 1. This was the world premiere of the film.

In February 2008, the movie's title was changed from The Beautiful Ordinary. It was released in two theaters in LA, one in New York and one in Washington, D.C. on April 11, 2008 and was released on DVD on June 3, 2008. The movie was filmed primarily in Wilmington, North Carolina during May 2006.

Plot
On the last day of school in 1999 several suburban teenagers decide to get high and party. Julia Ford (Amber Heard) feels frustrated because her boyfriend has failed his final year of school and must repeat it. Unsure whether or not to stay with him she decides to try to hook up with her friend Stacey Cherry's (Marnette Patterson) abusive boyfriend hoping that by sleeping with him Stacey will finally leave her boyfriend and Julia will figure out whether or not she wants to stay with her own boyfriend.

After her friends tease her about never having a boyfriend Brianne (Melonie Diaz) begins to openly flirt with drug dealer Mod. This incites Dawn's anger since, unbeknownst to the rest of their friends, Brianne and Dawn are secretly dating.

Tori (Leighton Meester) plans to take mushrooms with her best friend Sylvia but wants to delay it until after she is done babysitting. When Sylvia takes the mushrooms when they are in charge of the kids Tori decides to join her and the two end up shirking their babysitting duties.

Everyone convenes on the football field where a fight breaks out. Julia does not have sex with Stacey's boyfriend as he leaves her mid-make out. Stacey has sex with Riley, who had been desperate to lose his virginity, finally using the fact that she cheated on her boyfriend as an excuse to break up with him. Despite Dawn's willingness to go public with their relationship Brianne insists that they stay closeted.

In the morning Thomas, a shy photographer hanging out on the fringes of the group, develops photographs of the events of the previous day.

Cast

Critical reception
On Rotten Tomatoes it has a score of 0% based on reviews from 6 critics. On Metacritic it had an average score of 36 out of 100, based on reviews from 6 critics.

Peter Debruge of Variety said that the movie "demonstrates considerable promise on the part of its director and her up-and-coming cast" but had no "great secrets or revelations."
Laura Kern of The New York Times wrote: "Ultimately, the ensemble of more than twenty featured characters seems as vapid as the intentionally caricatured adults who pop up on occasion. Where are this decade's John Hugheses? Or even the Cameron Crowes?"

References

External links
 Official site
 
 
 

2007 films
2008 comedy-drama films
American comedy-drama films
American teen drama films
Films set in 1999
Films shot in North Carolina
2007 comedy films
2008 films
2007 drama films
Films scored by Dustin O'Halloran
2000s English-language films
2000s American films